Vega Alta is a town and municipality of Puerto Rico. Vega Alta is subdivided into seven barrios and Vega Alta barrio-pueblo (the downtown area and the administrative center of the city). It is part of the San Juan-Caguas-Guaynabo Metropolitan Statistical Area.

Vega Alta is west of San Juan, the capital of Puerto Rico. Vega Alta is known for the beach at Cerro Gordo. Other points of interest include the town's Catholic church, known as Inmaculada Concepción, which was founded in 1813, and the Vega Alta Forest.

During the first week of December, Vega Alta celebrates its patron saint, the Immaculate Conception.

”Vega Alta” translates to “high valley” in English.

History

Vega Alta was founded in 1775 by Francisco de los Olivos. It was first named La Vega de Espinosa and popularly known as el pueblo de los 'ñangotaos ("the town of the squatters", in reference to the jíbaros country folk who would wait for the train in a squatting position, due to lack of benches). Before this, it was part of a group of towns known as Las Vegas. It was then separated into two municipalities: Vega Baja and the other Vega Alta.

Puerto Rico was ceded by Spain in the aftermath of the Spanish–American War under the terms of the Treaty of Paris of 1898 and became a territory of the United States. In 1899, the United States conducted its first census of Puerto Rico finding that the population of Vega Alta was 6,107.

On October 12, 1898 the city's mayor, Francisco Vega, received U.S. troops as part of the Spanish–American War. On that same day, for the first time in Vega Alta's history, the U.S. flag was lifted on city hall. From 1902 to 1905, Vega Alta became once more part of the neighboring municipality of Vega Baja. In 1905, the government of Puerto Rico passed a law, allowing Vega Alta to become a municipality with its own limits.

Hacienda Carmen and Hacienda Ortega sugar plantations were owned by Juan Gualberto Landron y Martinez born in 1791 in Toa Baja . He owned slaves and purchased them, some coming directly from Africa.

The second-largest mosque in Puerto Rico, built in 1992, is located in Vega Alta.

Hurricane Maria on September 20, 2017 triggered numerous landslides in Vega Alta and 90% of homes made of wood were destroyed.

Geography
Vega Alta is on the northern coast in the Northern Karst region.

Río Cibuco, Río Mavilla and Río Unibón are located in Vega Alta.
The Javier Calderón Beach, better known as Cerro Gordo Beach is administered by the Puerto Rico Department of Sports and Recreation.

Vega Alta has a land area of 27.75 square miles (71.87 km2) and water area of 9.76 square miles (25.28 km2).

Barrios

Like all municipalities of Puerto Rico, Vega Alta is subdivided into barrios.

Bajura
Candelaria
Cienegueta
Espinosa
Maricao
Mavilla
Sabana
 Vega Alta barrio-pueblo

Sectors
Barrios (which are roughly comparable to minor civil divisions) and subbarrios, in turn, are further subdivided into smaller local populated place areas/units called sectores (sectors in English). The types of sectores may vary, from normally sector to urbanización to reparto to barriada to residencial, among others.

Special Communities

 (Special Communities of Puerto Rico) are marginalized communities whose citizens are experiencing a certain amount of social exclusion. A map shows these communities occur in nearly every municipality of the commonwealth.

Climate
According to the Weather Channel's website, June is the warmest month, March is the coolest month, October is the wettest month, and June is the driest month.
Records:
The highest recorded temperature was 98 °F in July 2007.
The lowest recorded temperature was 40 °F in January 1945.

Economy
In 1908, Vega Alta was producing coffee, sugar, oranges, tobacco and rum.

Agriculture
Banana, fruits, grains, and sugar cane.
Flowers and ornamental plants.
Dairy and meat cattle, pigs, and poultry.

Industry
Manufacture of chemicals, electrical and electronic machinery, furniture, food, and plastics.
Logistics Center

Tourism
There are 6 beaches in Vega Alta.

Lin-Manuel Miranda 

The Puerto Rican, award-winning, musician and playwright Lin-Manuel Miranda who created the Broadway hit, Hamilton, is from a family with roots in Vega Alta. In 2017, his father opened , a cafe and restaurant in the downtown area of Vega Alta, and in 2019 Lin-Manuel moved his memorabilia to a new gallery, the Lin-Manuel Miranda Gallery, a few steps from Placita Güisín and opened a store there too, TeeRico. The location has become a tourist attraction. In one of his musicals, "In the Heights", a woman named "Dani" supposedly is from Vega Alta, according to the following lines:

When I was a little girl, growing up in the hills of Vega Alta

My favorite time of year, was christmastime.

Culture

Festivals and events
Vega Alta celebrates its patron saint festival in December. The  is a religious and cultural celebration that generally features parades, games, artisans, amusement rides, regional food, and live entertainment.

Other festivals and events celebrated in Vega Alta include:
 Three Kings Fiestas - January
  (Sung Rosary) - February
  - February
 Kite Festival - July
 Virgen del Carmen Parade - July
 Rooster Festival - October

Sports
Vega Alta Maceteros are the Double-A (baseball) team of Vega Alta.

Vega Alta is known for having amateur ball players as well as professional. Basketball is played in local communities. Other sports practiced include tennis, volleyball, handball, and amateur surfing among others.

Vega Alta is also known for having famous Major League Baseball players such as The Molina Brothers which consist of Yadier Molina, Bengie Molina and José Molina. Other famous sport personalities include former New York Yankees center fielder Bernie Williams and professional boxer Ángel Chacón.

Music
A well known musician from Vega Alta was Ladislao Martinez a.k.a. El Maestro Ladi (June 27, 1898–February 1, 1979), a master cuatro musician. He became the first Puerto Rican to play a cuatro solo on the radio.

Fiel a la Vega, a rock en español (rock in Spanish) band, was formed in 1994. Band members Tito Auger and Ricky Laureano are from Vega Alta, while brothers Pedro Arraiza and Jorge Arraiza come from next-door Vega Baja. Their first album spawned hits like Salimos de Aquí and El Wanabí, both of which were released with videos.

Demographic

Government

The main women's prison of the Puerto Rico Department of Corrections and Rehabilitation, Escuela Industrial para Mujeres in Vega Alta, opened in 1954, replacing a prison in Arecibo; work began on the facility in 1952.

Past and present mayors
Antonio Navas
Lorenzo Cabrera
Emilio Escalera
Arturo Rivera
Ramon Cestero
Emilio Davila Diaz
Jose Vega Nevarez
Francisco Chinea
Carmelo Mercado
Jacinto Seijo
Jose Rosado Negron, (1977–1980; b. 1934, d. 1999)
Manuel "Manolin" Chinea (PDP, 1981–1993)
Isabelo "Chabelo" Molina (PNP, 1993–2001)
Juan "Mane" Cruzado (PPD, 2001–2002) resigned, Vice-Mayor Jose Colon assumed post.
Jose Colon (PPD, 2002–2005)
Isabelo "Chabelo" Molina (PNP, 2005–2017)
Oscar Santiago Martinez (PPD, 2017–2021)
María Vega Pagán (PNP, 2021–Present)

Transportation
Puerto Rico's Highway 22 provides access to Vega Alta from as far away as Mayagüez, and connects the municipality to San Juan. Highway 2 also provides access from the western municipalities of Manatí, Arecibo and the eastern San Juan suburban municipalities of Bayamón and Guaynabo bordering the shore to the Atlantic Ocean. It takes approximately 30 minutes to reach the town from San Juan.
The closest airport is Luis Muñoz Marín International Airport in Carolina.
Other public transportation close to the area is Tren Urbano metro system in Bayamón.

There are 16 bridges in Vega Alta.

Symbols
The  has an official flag and coat of arms.

Flag
This municipality has a flag.

Coat of arms
This municipality has a coat of arms.

Anthem
The anthem used by Vega Alta is the musical composition created in 1958, with lyrics by Domingo Figueroa Ramírez Arreglo and music by Domingo and Elliot A. Knight.

Education

Public schools
 Antonio Paoli/Elementary
 Elemental Urbana/Elementary
 Elisa Davila Vazquez/Elementary
 Ignacio Miranda/elementary school
 Dr. Cañaco Stalingrad III/ High School
 Jose D. Rosado/Elementary
 Jose M. Pagan/Elementary
 Rafael Hernadez/Elementary
 Apolo San Antonio/Former high school
 Nueva Escuela Brenas/Middle School, Second Unit
 Adelaida Vega/Middle School, Second Unit
 Ileana de Gracia/High School
 Ladislao Martinez (Maestro Ladi)/Second High School

Private schools
 Academia Dicipulos de Cristo (Disciples of Christ)/Elementary and Middle School
 Colegio de la Vega
 Academia Cambu

Notable natives and residents

 Yadier Molina - Professional baseball player
 Dennis Rivera - Professional wrestler, brother of Savio Vega
 Savio Vega - Professional wrestler, brother of Dennis Rivera

Further reading
Leonardo Santana-Rabell. Historia de Vega Alta de Espinosa. 2da edición, Editorial La Torre del Viejo, Río Piedras, Puerto Rico, 1995.
Domingo Figueroa Ramirez. Memorias y versos: Desde algun rincón de Vega Alta. 1era edición Vega Coop y Econo Mendez Class

See also

List of Puerto Ricans
History of Puerto Rico
Did you know-Puerto Rico?

References

External links
 Estado Libre Asociado de Puerto Rico Senado (in Spanish)
 

 
Municipalities of Puerto Rico
Populated places established in 1775
1770s establishments in Puerto Rico
1775 establishments in the Spanish West Indies